Luke Leonard (born January 17, 1975) is an American artist whose work spans the performing and visual arts. He is a theater director, designer, experimental playwright, actor, filmmaker, and the Founding Artistic Director of Monk Parrots, a New York-based multidisciplinary theatre company.  Leonard's stage productions have been described as "outstanding" by The New York Times, and “bold and experimental...a clear vision...pure theatrical experience” by nytheatre.com. He lives in New York.

Life and career 
Luke Landric Leonard was born and raised in Houston, Texas, where he attended Cypress Creek High School, played football, and acted in school plays. He left the football team after his junior year to become president of Cy Creek's Theatre Department and to focus solely on acting in preparation for college auditions. He studied theatre at Sam Houston State University before moving to New York City in 1995 to enroll in the BFA Acting Program at Brooklyn College, where he graduated in 1998.

1996–2001
Leonard was among the pioneering artists living and working in DUMBO, Brooklyn, where he founded DUMBO Theater eXchange a/k/a DTX with Natalie Cook Leonard and Yukihiro Nishiyama.  DTX promoted emerging talent by presenting new writers and directors and fostered neighborhood development within the downtown Brooklyn area.  DTX; however, did not survive gentrification and the venue was added to the list of artist casualties forced out of DUMBO. On December 15, 2000, a week before Christmas, Leonard and his wife were illegally vacated from their loft on Water Street along with 60 other tenants. DTX presented approximately 30 productions (short and full length) circa 2000–2001 and hosted all theater events for the 4th Annual DUMBO Arts Festival, produced by Joy Glidden/d.u.m.b.o. arts center (dac). Leonard also studied acting and directing with legendary, experimental director Joseph Chaikin during this time and corresponded with Chaikin by letters until his passing in 2003.

2002–2004
Michelle Moskowitz-Brown hired Leonard to create a theatre series for a new performance space at Brooklyn Information and Culture called BRIC Studio (now BRIC Arts Media House).  Leonard established Theater Nexus, a monthly series devoted to emerging and established theatre artists.  After losing the DUMBO space, BRIC became DTX's new home for promoting alternative theatre in NYC.  Curated by S. Melinda Dunlap and Leonard, Theater Nexus presented experimental work by numerous artists, such as, 13P, Mac Wellman, Jeffrey M. Jones, Young Jean Lee, Erin Courtney, Ken Rus Schmoll, Connie Congdon, S. Melinda Dunlap, Luke Leonard, David Todd, B. Walker Sampson, Barbara Cassidy, Jonathan Bernstein and Douglas Green, to name a few. In 2003, Leonard became the father of actress Gates Leonard.

2007–2010
DTX changed its name to Monk Parrots in 2007 and Leonard was accepted to the highly selective graduate directing program at The University of Texas at Austin, where he studied stage direction and studio art and received a Master of Fine Arts in 2010. Leonard was influenced by renowned artists at UT-Austin, such as, Michael Smith, sculptor Margo Sawyer, and playwrights Kirk Lynn and Steven Dietz. In 2009 he worked at Berliner Ensemble for experimental theatre director and visual artist Robert Wilson (director) and directed the Italian Premiere of Israel Horovitz's L'indiano vuole il Bronx (The Indian Wants the Bronx). In 2010 he directed the Texas Premiere of David Lang and Mac Wellman's The Difficulty of Crossing a Field, which was nominated for eight Austin Critics' Table Awards including Best Opera.

2010–2012
Leonard returned to New York to resume his role as artistic director of Monk Parrots and began building a new body of performance work. His concept-driven approach explores the possibilities of theatre and with his company he began to hone an "edgy choreographed directorial style"

Luke Leonard/Monk Parrots made Here I Go with playwright David Todd; a theatrical portrait of a Texan housewife in her 60s contemplating suicide inspired by the death of Leonard's grandmother. It was presented at 59E59 Theaters from May 22, 2012, to June 3, 2012.  Leonard created the main character, Lynette, her circumstances and a performance structure, then asked Todd to write six monologues that Monk Parrots could arrange during rehearsals. The staging was created first with five, nonspeaking actors, then a prerecorded voice of Lynette was added to the actors' movements; blurring the lines between dance and theatre. Reviewer David Roberts described Here I Go as "a brilliantly conceived and executed performance work that truly crosses artistic boundaries."

2012–2014
Over brunch in New York, playwright Kirk Lynn asked Leonard what he was working on. Leonard handed him a copy of coaching legend Bum Phillips' autobiography and said he wanted to make an 'opera' based on Phillips' life. Lynn smiled and Leonard asked if he would read the book and consider writing the libretto. Later, Lynn agreed to create the libretto under the following condition, that Peter Stopschinski compose the score.
Former Monk Parrots board member, Steven Beede, Esq., initiated a call for Leonard to speak with Bum and Debbie Phillips. When asked how they felt about an opera based on Bum's life, Bum Phillips replied, "I can't sing a lick!" They arranged to meet in person, then Leonard, Stopschinski, and Leonard's parents traveled to the Phillips' ranch in Goliad, Texas to discuss the performance rights. Upon arrival, Leonard shook hands with Bum Phillips and said, "Mr. Phillips, it's a pleasure to meet you." Phillips replied, "It's a pleasure to want to be met at 89." They ate Subway sandwiches, baked beans, and pecan pie and Leonard and Stopschinski left with the Phillips' blessing to make the opera.

The world premiere of Bum Phillips Opera was presented in the Ellen Stewart Theatre at La MaMa Experimental Theatre Club in New York from March 12, 2014, to March 30, 2014. It was attended by Bum Phillips’ son, coach Wade Phillips, former NFL players, Dan Pastorini and Larry Harris, and featured on the nationally televised program NFL Films Presents produced by NFL Films. Wade Phillips commented, “It’s a great tribute for us and our family. There’s not many people that get an opera, Don Giovanni and the Barber of Seville.” Dan Pastorini said, “Let’s face it, Bum Phillips and opera don't belong in the same sentence," but admitted that he had tears running down his face by the end. After seeing the New York premiere, Pastorini made it a mission to bring the opera to Houston, which he did in September 2015.

The Texas Premiere was presented at The Stafford Centre on September 24, 2015, and attended by Hall of Fame running back Earl Campbell and Luv Ya Blue Houston Oilers, Mike Barber, Vernon Perry, Billy Johnson, Mike Renfro, and many more.

2015–2016
The Australian company Gertrude Opera discovered Leonard's work and hired him as Resident International Stage Director for The Opera Studio Melbourne. He directed and designed the Australian Premiere of The Difficulty of Crossing a Field to critical acclaim for the inaugural Nagambie Lakes Opera Festival, and he directed and designed the World Premiere of The Scottish Opera, an 80-minute reimagining of Giuseppe Verdi's Macbeth, arranged by composer Peter Stopschinski for an eight piece orchestra with electric instruments, which premiered at the 2nd Annual Nagambie Lakes Opera Festival.

Work 

Opera

 The Difficulty of Crossing a Field, 2010, Texas Premiere, Stage Director, Production Designer
 The Turn of the Screw, 2012, Opera Moderne, New York, Stage Director, Production Designer
 Bum Phillips, 2014, World Premiere, Monk Parrots/La MaMa Experimental Theatre Club, New York, Stage Director, Production Designer
 Bum Phillips (opera), 2015, Texas Premiere, Stage Director, Production Designer
 The Difficulty of Crossing a Field, 2015, Australian Premiere, Stage Director, Production Designer
 The Scottish Opera, 2016, World Premiere, Nagambie Lakes Opera Festival, Australia, Stage Director, Production Designer
 BMP: Next Generation, 2018, Beth Morrison (producer) Projects, National Sawdust, Stage Director
 The Dinner Party Operas, 2018, American Opera Projects, Brooklyn Museum, Stage Director, Production Designer
 The Shepherdess and The Chimney Sweep, chamber opera by Hannah Lash, 2019, American Opera Projects, SITE Santa Fe and Las Puertas, Stage Director, Production Designer
 Macbeth (opera), 2019, Yarra Valley Opera Festival, Australia, Stage Director, Production Designer

Theatre

 Desiderata, 1996, Writer/Performer
 Inside the State Hospital, 1997, Writer/Performer
 When We Sleep..., 1997, Writer/Performer
 Nil to Nigh, 1998, Writer/Director/Designer/Performer
 Bony & Poot, 2000, Writer/Director/Designer
 Untitled, 1985, 2000, Writer/Director/Designer
 Disposable Play No.2, 2000, Writer/Director/Designer
 Broadway, 2000, Writer/Director/Designer
 Movement Stolen From Joseph Chaikin's "Firmament" That We're Probably Doing Wrong Anyway, 2000, Writer/Director/Performer/Designer
 50 ft of Film, 2001, Writer/Director/Designer/Performer
 Mac Wellman's Mister Original Bugg, 2002, Director/Designer
 Performance Record #1, 2002, Writer/Director/Designer
 Evil-in-Progress, 2002, Writer/Director/Designer
 Wonder/Play, 2002, Writer/Director/Designer
 Head/line, 2004, Director/Designer/Performer
 Jeffrey M. Jones' The Crazy Plays, 2004, Director/Designer
 Pitched, 2006, Director/Designer
 Our Lady of 121st Street, 2008, Director/Designer
 Bad Penny, 2008, Director
 L'indiano vuole il Bronx, 2009, Director/Lighting Designer
 The Art of Depicting Nature as it is Seen by Toads, 2010, Concept/Director/Designer/Performer
 Gay Rodeo By-Laws, 2011, Writer/Director/Designer
 Here I Go, 2012, Concept/Director/Designer
 After an Earlier Incident, 2013, Concept/Director/Designer
 Welcome to the Kingdom of Saudi Arabia, 2015, Writer/Director/Designer

Film

 No-Account Film, 1999, (short, unreleased), Writer/Director/Cinematographer/Editor
 Urchin, 2007, (feature, released), Cinematographer
 Antiquated Play, 2007, (short, unreleased), Writer/Director/Performer/Cinematographer/Editor/Producer
 Follow Me Down, 2017, (feature, pre-production), Writer/Director/Producer

Awards 
 2015 – Outstanding Stage Director, OperaChaser Melbourne, The Difficulty of Crossing a Field
 2016 – Outstanding Lighting Design, OperaChaser Melbourne, The Scottish Opera

See also 
 Experimental theatre
 Devised theatre
 Postdramatic theatre

References

External links 
 Luke Leonard Official site
 Monk Parrots Official site
 Bum Phillips Opera Official site
 NFL Films Presents, Show: #7

Artists from Texas
1975 births
American artists
American theatre directors
Living people
Brooklyn College alumni